Covington Township is a civil township of Baraga County in the U.S. state of Michigan.  The population was 375 at the 2020 census.

Communities
There are no incorporated municipalities in the township. There are a few unincorporated communities and historic locales:
 Covington is an unincorporated community on US 141 near the junction with M-28. The Covington ZIP code 49919 serves northern areas of the township.
Leo is an unincorporated community in the township.
Murphy is an unincorporated community in the township.
Perch is an unincorporated community in the township.
This stop on the Duluth, South Shore, and Atlantic Railroad is a Finnish village, established by August Kotila in 1903. A post office was established in 1912. The Watton ZIP code 49970 serves southwestern areas of Covington Township.

Geography

King Lake and Worm Lake are located in Covington Township.

Demographics
As of the census of 2000, there were 569 people, 238 households, and 158 families residing in the township.  The population density was 2.9 per square mile (1.1/km2).  There were 335 housing units at an average density of 1.7 per square mile (0.7/km2).  The racial makeup of the township was 97.54% White, 0.88% Native American, 0.35% from other races, and 1.23% from two or more races. Hispanic or Latino of any race were 1.23% of the population. 68.0% were of Finnish, 5.9% German and 5.0% French ancestry according to Census 2000.

There were 238 households, out of which 19.3% had children under the age of 18 living with them, 59.2% were married couples living together, 2.5% had a female householder with no husband present, and 33.6% were non-families. 29.8% of all households were made up of individuals, and 15.5% had someone living alone who was 65 years of age or older.  The average household size was 2.23 and the average family size was 2.77.

In the township the population was spread out, with 16.5% under the age of 18, 4.6% from 18 to 24, 18.3% from 25 to 44, 35.3% from 45 to 64, and 25.3% who were 65 years of age or older.  The median age was 51 years. For every 100 females, there were 108.4 males.  For every 100 females age 18 and over, there were 106.5 males.

The median income for a household in the township was $37,344, and the median income for a family was $44,375. Males had a median income of $35,000 versus $29,375 for females. The per capita income for the township was $16,297.  About 6.1% of families and 11.6% of the population were below the poverty line, including 4.5% of those under age 18 and 33.6% of those age 65 or over.

References

External links
Upper Peninsula's guide to Covington
Photos of outhouses at Nestoria for the DSS&A railway depot
Covington Parks and Recreation Committee

Townships in Baraga County, Michigan
Townships in Michigan